The Israeli municipality merger of November 2003 was a merger of various select municipalities under the Israeli system of local governance.

List of merged municipalities
 Baqa-Jatt (merger of Jat and Baqa al-Gharbiyye)
 Binyamina-Giv'at Ada (Binyamina and Giv'at Ada)
 Carmel City (Daliyat al-Karmel and Isfiya)
 Kokhav Ya'ir (Kokhav Ya'ir and Tzur Yigal)
 Modi'in-Maccabim-Re'ut (Modi'in and Maccabim-Re'ut)
 Shaghur (Majd al-Krum, Deir al-Asad and Bi'ina)
 Kadima-Zoran (Kadima and Tzoran)
 Yehud-Monosson (Neve Monosson and Yehud)

Controversy
The mergers were heavily criticized within the Arab and Druze sectors. A major Druze merger, called City of Five, including Abu Snan, Julis, Kafr Yasif, Yanuh-Jat and Yarka, fell through. Two other mergers (Carmel City and Shaghur) were eventually reverted.

Local councils in Israel